Portuguese–Turkish relations are foreign relations between Portugal and Turkey. Portugal has an embassy in Ankara. Turkey has an embassy in Lisbon. Both countries are full members of NATO. Also Portugal is an EU member and Turkey is an EU candidate.

History 
Relations between Turkey and Portugal date back to the mid-19th century. Diplomatic relations were temporarily discontinued during World War 1, but were officially resumed on 28 May 1926. Turkey appointed an ambassador to Portugal in 1931, and Portugal appointed an ambassador to Turkey in 1941.

See also
Foreign relations of Portugal
Foreign relations of Turkey
EU–Turkey relations 
Turks in Portugal 
Turks in Europe

References

External links
Portuguese embassy in Ankara
Turkish Ministry of Foreign Affairs about the relations with Portugal

Turkey
Bilateral relations of Turkey